Let Love Rule is the eighth studio album by American musician Ledisi. It was released in September 2017 under Verve Records. The album was nominated for Best R&B Album at the 60th Grammy Awards in January 2018.

Critical reception

In his review for AllMusic, editor Andy Kellman wrote that Ledisi "continues to roll with Let Love Rule, an album rich with her characteristically positive and proud outlook and superhuman vocal skill. It's something of a milestone for Ledisi and long-term collaborator Rex Rideout, who have been recording together since 2007. The four songs they co-wrote are top of the line, showing they've only gained steam since then."

Track listing

Notes
 denotes co-producer

Charts

Release history

References

2017 albums
Ledisi albums